Oncideres alicei is a species of beetle in the family Cerambycidae. It was described by Lane in 1977. It is known from Brazil.

References

alicei
Beetles described in 1977